Hamilton Bertie Gibson (14 October 1914 – 22 March 2001), generally known as Tony Gibson,  was a British psychologist, anarchist, and model.  He became known for his objection to Great Britain's involvement in World War II and his subsequent imprisonment for being an unregistered conscientious objector.

In 1939, while working as a life model for art students, he was selected to model for Brylcreem advertisements. During the Battle of Britain he was depicted wearing an RAF uniform, despite the fact that by then he was in prison as a conscientious objector. After serving three sentences he agreed to work as an ambulance driver and then as an agricultural labourer.

In the 1950s he studied sociology at the London School of Economics and psychology at the Institute of Psychiatry, following which he undertook research at the Institute of Criminology in Cambridge.

During the period at Cambridge, he developed the Spiral Maze, a psychomotor test that was able to distinguish between normal boys and those who were maladjusted or delinquent. This test has also been found to be useful in assessing psychomotor impairment due to drugs.

In 1970 he founded the Psychology Department at University of Hertfordshire which he headed until 1976. He was the first president of the British Society of Experimental and Clinical Hypnosis.

In 1981 he published a biography of Hans Eysenck, with whom he had worked at the Institute of Psychiatry in London

References

External links

  Tony Gibson page Daily Bleed's Anarchist Encyclopedia
  Michael Heap's memoir of Tony Gibson

1914 births
2001 deaths
British conscientious objectors
British anarchists
British psychologists
Academics of the University of Hertfordshire
20th-century British psychologists